Brian O'Neil may refer to:
 Brian E. O'Neil (died 1985), American philosopher 
 Brian O'Neil (footballer, born 1972), Scottish former footballer who played for Celtic, Aberdeen, Wolfsburg, Derby County and Preston North End
 Brian O'Neil (footballer, born 1944), English former footballer who played for Burnley, Southampton and Huddersfield Town

See also
 Brian O'Neill (disambiguation)
 Bryan O'Neil (died 1954), British archaeologist